Compulsory voting, also called universal civic duty voting or mandatory voting, is the requirement that registered voters participate in an election. In practice, one only needs to check-in at a polling place, submit a blank ballot, or provide an excused reason, such as disability, illness, age, travel, a natural disaster, or religious objections. 

21 countries, including 11 in Latin America, had compulsory voting laws as of January 2023, with the countries enforcing their laws having much higher turnout (high 80's vs. mid 60's).

History

Antiquity
Athenian democracy held that it was every citizen's duty to participate in decision-making, but attendance at the assembly was voluntary. Sometimes there was some form of social opprobrium to those not participating, particularly if they were engaging in other public activity at the time of the assembly. For example, Aristophanes's comedy Acharnians 17–22, in the 5th century BC, shows public slaves herding citizens from the agora into the assembly meeting place (Pnyx) with a red-stained rope. Those with red on their clothes were fined. This usually happened if fewer than 6,000 people were in attendance, and more were needed for the assembly to continue.

In Republican Rome, the legitimacy of the form of government known as res publica, which entrusted the powers of sovereignty to an elected aristocracy, was most evident in the Roman right to suffragium. Cicero argues that the right to vote provided Roman citizens with a certain degree of political participation, thereby guaranteeing their de facto ownership of their property, which they could administer as they wished. In practice, voting was conducted only in Rome, either in the Campus Martius or in the Forum, and not many citizens would have been able to afford the journey or take time off to vote. In addition, contrary to Greek custom, there was no economic compensation for voting. However, Cicero mentions an election that could not continue because of particularly low voter turnout, requiring a temporary draft to be implemented, though it is unclear if this was an exceptional case.

Modern era
From the 19th century onward only a relatively small number of democracies have introduced compulsory voting at one time or another. From 1862 to 1998, compulsory voting was enacted in 20 democracies, most of which were in Western Europe or Latin America. Of the top 50 of the 167 countries listed in descending order on EIU's Democracy Index for 2021, Australia (No. 9), Uruguay (No. 13), Luxembourg (No. 14), Chile (No. 25), Belgium (No. 36), Brazil (No. 46) and Argentina (No. 50) enforce compulsory voting.

Belgium has the oldest extant compulsory voting system which was introduced in 1893 for men and in 1948 for women. 

Compulsory voting for national elections was introduced in Australia in 1924, with states and territories passing their own compulsory voting laws at various times. Voluntary voting in Australia before 1924 accounted between 47% and 78% turnout of eligible voters. Following the introduction of compulsory federal voting in 1924 this figure increased to between 91% and 96%, with only 5% of eligible voters accounted as not enrolled.

Venezuela and the Netherlands are countries that have moved from compulsory voting to voluntary participation in 1967 and 1993, respectively. Turnout in the Netherlands decreased from 95% to around 80%. Venezuela saw turnout drop from 82% to 61% in 1993 once compulsion was removed.

Arguments for

Capture voter preferences 
A system with higher turnout helps make the electorate more representative and voter suppression more difficult. This major step towards the universal democratic principle of "one person, one vote" strengthens democracies and aligns the choices of its politicians with the preferences of its citizens. Since lower-turnout races are not randomized samples of an electorate (unlike a citizens' assembly), they distort the wishes and power of the electorate.

Civil responsibility 
Supporters argue the democratic election of governing representatives is a citizen's responsibility as opposed to a right. Equating in kind to similar civil responsibilities such as taxation, jury duty, compulsory education or military service, voting in these democracies is regarded as one of the "duties to community" mentioned in the United Nations Universal Declaration of Human Rights. This view asserts that, by introducing an obligation to vote, all citizens governed by a democracy partake in the responsibility for the government appointed by democratic election.

Improve candidate choices 
Monash University political scientist Waleed Aly argues that whether compulsory voting favors the right or the left is beside the point, because the most beneficial aspect of compulsory voting is that it will improve the caliber of individuals who run for office and the quality of the decisions that they make: "In a compulsory election, it does not pay to energize your base to the exclusion of all other voters. Since elections cannot be determined by turnout, they are decided by swing voters and won in the center... That is one reason Australia’s version of the far right lacks anything like the power of its European or American counterparts. Australia has had some bad governments, but it hasn’t had any truly extreme ones and it isn’t nearly as vulnerable to demagogues."

Mild penalties provide big boosts in turnout 
Penalties only need to be modest to boost turnout and achieve the goal of attaining a much more representative electorate, especially since the public and the courts usually insist on a seamless voting process for places with mandatory voting laws.

Paradox of voting 
Supporters of compulsory voting also argue that voting addresses the paradox of voting, which is that for a rational, self-interested voter, the costs of voting will normally exceed the expected benefits. The paradox disproportionately affects the socially disadvantaged, for whom the costs of voting tend to be greater. Australian academic and supporter of compulsory voting, Lisa Hill, has argued that a prisoner's dilemma situation arises under voluntary systems for marginalised citizens: it seems rational for them to abstain from voting, under the assumption that others in their situation are also doing so, in order to conserve their limited resources. However, since these are people who have a pronounced need for representation, this decision is irrational. Hill argues that the introduction of compulsory voting removes this dilemma.

Political legitimacy 
The idea that compulsory voting results in a higher degree of political legitimacy is based on higher voter turnout and the more representative electorate that brings.

Protect against demagogues 
High levels of participation decreases the risk of political instability created by crises or charismatic but sectionally focused demagogues.

Reduce income inequality 
A 2005 Inter-American Development Bank working paper purported to show that there was a correlation between compulsory voting, when enforced strictly, and improved income distribution, as measured by the Gini coefficient and the bottom income quintiles of the population. However, a more recent Conference Board of Canada study on World income inequality – also relying on the Gini index – shows that income inequality is lowest in the Scandinavian countries, where compulsory voting has never existed, while Australia, and to a lesser extent Belgium, which strictly enforce their compulsory voting legislation, have a higher income inequality level than a number of other Western countries, such as Canada, France, Germany, Switzerland and the Netherlands, where compulsory voting does not exist.

Remove voting restrictions 
Supporters of compulsory voting also argue that just as the secret ballot is designed to prevent interference with the votes actually cast, compelling voters to the polls for an election removes interference with accessing a polling place, reducing the impact that external factors such as the weather, transport, or restrictive employers might have. If everybody must vote, restrictions on voting are identified and steps are taken to remove them.

This notion is especially reinforced when both men and women are required to vote and further sustained by diligent enforcement of laws requiring registration of all eligible voters (deemed adult and without exclusion of any significant community within the population).

A growing voter preference towards pre-polling such as vote by mail can make participation easier, where the voter can fulfil their obligation more at their own convenience prior to polling day, rather than trying to arrange release from their responsibilities on the nominated date of polling.

Stimulate political interest and education 
Other perceived advantages to compulsory voting are the stimulation of broader interest politics, as a sort of civil education and political stimulation, which creates a better informed population. For example, since far fewer campaign funds are needed to convince people to vote, they can be directed towards discussing proposed policies with a wider range of voters.

Arguments against

Concerns that policies can address 
Concerns about fines landing harder on the poorest citizens can lead to reforms to ensure penalties are mild for the poorest citizens and that voting is accessible and seamless for all to help assure concerned voters that mandatory voting won't become a regressive tax. Ways to ensure the fine isn't regressive, include making sure it doesn't compound over time, is weighted based on income, and that there's an option to do an hour of community service if someone prefers to spend time but not money.  

Another concern expressed about compulsory voting is that it would compel speech, which violates freedom of speech which includes the freedom not to speak. Former Australian opposition leader Mark Latham urged Australians to lodge blank votes for the 2010 election. He stated the government should not force citizens to vote or threaten them with a fine. At the 2013 federal election, considering the threat of a non-voting fine of up to $20, there was a turnout of 92%, of whom 6% lodged either informal or blank ballot papers. Systems in democratic countries, which have a secret ballot, allow for blank ballots, but voting systems could also add a 'none of the above' option to each race so as to provide multiple clear ways for voters to refrain from speaking/voting if, for some reason, a voter does not want to submit a partially or fully blank ballot. 

Religious objection is one that many Christadelphians and Jehovah's witnesses, for example, cite as for why they should not participate in political events. As a result, many countries allow religious beliefs as a valid excuse for not going to the polls.

Concerns that policies can't address 
Libertarians in particular debate to what extent voting is a civic duty and not just a civic right. Even in the case of the US where most Americans do see voting as a civic duty, most Americans in a 2020 poll did not like the idea of imposing a $20 fine on those who did not cite an excuse for not voting including a conscientious objection.

Research 
A study of a Swiss canton where compulsory voting was enforced found that compulsory voting significantly increased electoral support for leftist policy positions in referendums by up to 20 percentage points. Another study found that the effects of universal turnout in the United States would likely be small in national elections, but that universal turnout could matter in close elections, such as the presidential elections of 2000 and 2004. In the United States, Democrats would most likely fare better under universal voting (as nonvoters are generally more Democratic) but due to the dearth of close races in the United States, universal voting would change "very few election outcomes." Research on compulsory voting in Australia found that it increased the vote shares and seat shares of the Australian Labor Party by 7 to 10 percentage points and led to greater pension spending at the national level. While weakly enforced compulsory voting in Austria increased overall turnout by roughly 10 percentage points, there is "no evidence that this change in turnout affected government spending patterns (in levels or composition) or electoral outcomes." A 2016 study finds that compulsory voting reduces the gender gap in electoral engagement in several ways. A 2016 study of the Netherlands found that the abolition of compulsory voting increased the vote share of Dutch social democratic parties while reducing the vote share of "minor and extreme parties." Research suggests that higher rates of voter turnout lead to higher top tax rates.

Public opinion 
According to a 1997 paper by Malcolm Mackerras and Ian McAllister, in Australia "polls taken over the years have consistently shown a community support of between 60 and 70 per cent" for compulsory voting. In 2005, polls taken by Roy Morgan Research and Ipsos-Mackay found 71 and 74 percent support respectively. Both polls also found there was roughly equal support for compulsory voting among supporters of Australia's major political groups, the Coalition and the Australian Labor Party.

Current and past use by countries
, 21 countries were recorded as having compulsory voting. Of these, only 10 countries (additionally one Swiss canton and one Indian state) enforce it. As of January 2020, of the 36 member states of the Organisation for Economic Co-operation and Development, only Australia and Luxembourg had forms of compulsory voting which were enforced in practice. Voting in Belgium, Greece, Mexico and Turkey is compulsory, but is not enforced.

Repealed
Countries where voting is no longer compulsory:
Albania – Compulsory voting, which existed throughout the Communist period and produced official turnouts of 100%, was repealed with the new election law of November 1990 and January 1991.
Austria – At the national level, introduced in 1924. Repealed in 1992. At the provincial level in Styria, Tyrol and Vorarlberg, repealed in 1992.
Bulgaria – Due to the low turnouts at elections, the Bulgarian parliament introduced compulsory voting in 2016 – the only European country to do so in more than 50 years – but the Constitutional Court annulled the law the following year, declaring that the right to vote was a subjective right and not a public function that entailed an obligation to vote.
Cyprus – Introduced in 1960. Repealed in 2017, after having been inactive for many years.
Dominican Republic – Compulsory voting, which was not enforced in practice, was repealed with the 2010 Constitution which states: "Nobody can be obligated or coerced, under any pretext, in the exercise of their right of suffrage or to reveal their vote." In 2017, a proposal by an opposition party to establish compulsory voting was defeated.
Guatemala – Repealed in 1990.
Italy – Between 1945 and 1993. (Possible arbitrary or social sanctions, called the "innocuous sanction", where it might, for example, be difficult to get a daycare place for your child or similar.)
Lebanon – Repealed at least since the electoral law of 1996.
Netherlands – Introduced in 1917 along with universal suffrage, repealed it in 1967. In 1946, a survey conducted by the Netherlands Institute of Public Opinion (NIPO), in the Netherlands, reported that 66 percent of those asked favored repealing compulsory voting. In 1966, the public was polled again, this time by the Politics in the Netherlands survey, and responded 69 percent in favor of the policy. In 1967, the Free University of Amsterdam polled voters on whether they thought the compulsory voting laws at the time were "right" or "wrong"; 70 percent of those asked answered "right", 28 percent answered "wrong", and 2 percent gave no opinion. In January 1969, the Netherlands Institute of Public Opinion polled again, and found 53 percent of those asked were in favor of abolishing compulsory voting, while 29 percent wished to keep it. In 1999, support for compulsory voting in the Netherlands was just at 35 percent.
Panama – The current laws of Panama do not mention any sanctions and do not specify the obligation to vote.
Philippines – Compulsory and enforced during the regime of Ferdinand Marcos.
Portugal – 1933 Portuguese constitutional referendum, not enforced.
Spain – 1907–1923, but not enforced.
Switzerland – Widespread among the country's 26 cantons in the 19th century but progressively abandoned since then with only Schaffhausen still retaining it.
 US State of Georgia – By Article XII of the 1777 Constitution. This provision was omitted from the revised Georgia constitution of 1789.
Venezuela – Removed in 1993. Had been largely unenforced before then. Turnout since 1998 has averaged 62% compared with almost 90% on average between 1970 and 1993 during compulsory voting.

Measures to encourage voting
Although voting in a country may be compulsory, penalties for failing to vote are not always strictly enforced. In Australia and Brazil, providing a legitimate reason for not voting (such as illness) is accepted. In Australia, if a citizen is asked why they did not vote and they reply that it is against their religion, the Electoral Act provides that this answer must be taken as conclusive, and no further action is to be taken. Belgian voters can vote in an embassy if they are abroad or can empower another voter to cast the vote in their name; the voter must give a "permission to vote" and carry a copy of the ID card and their own on the actual elections.

States that sanction nonvoters with fines generally impose small or nominal penalties. This can be seen as reflecting the practical rationale for compulsory voting – that compulsion is aimed at making it more irksome not to vote than to vote, and therefore mild penalties are all that is required. However, penalties for failing to vote are not limited to fines and legal sanctions. Belgian voters who repeatedly fail to vote in elections may be subject to disenfranchisement. Singaporean voters who fail to vote in a general election or presidential election will be subjected to disenfranchisement until a valid reason is given or a fine is paid. Goods and services provided by public offices may be denied to those failing to vote in Peru and Greece. In Brazil, people who fail to vote in an election are barred from obtaining a passport and subject to other restrictions until settling their situation before an electoral court or after they have voted in the two most recent elections. If a Bolivian voter fails to participate in an election, the person may be denied withdrawal of the salary from the bank for three months.

A postal vote may be available for those for whom it is difficult to attend a polling station. Pre-poll voting at nominated polling stations in Australia has been increasing in recent years.

See also
Citizens' assembly
Get out the vote
Jury duty

References

Further reading

External links
International Institute for Democracy and Electoral Assistance – Compulsory voting information
Suffrage – The CIA World Factbook
Compulsory Voting, Not
– Australian Electoral Commission – Electoral Backgrounder – Compulsory Voting
– Australian Electoral Commission Australian Electoral Commission
European Consortium for Political Research (ECPR) Sessions of Workshops 2007, Workshop No.7: Compulsory Voting: Principle and Practice – academic conference papers on compulsory voting

Elections
Voting